Modulator is an EP of electronic music by Information Society. It was released on September 22, 2009.

Track listing
"Seeds of Pain" (Dave Audé Remix)
"Baby Just Wants" (Lthrboots Remix)
"Run Away" (Tommie Sunshine Remix)
"I Love It When…" (Jon Gill's Downtown Remix)
"More To This" (Sucias TTV Mix)
"This Way Tonight" (Ego Likeness Remix)
" Baby Just Wants" (Wesley Krusher's Ghost Girl Remix)
"Don’t Touch the Devil"
"Wrongful Death" (Live 2008)

External links
Release information

2009 EPs